Uros Nikolić (Serbian Cyrillic: Урош Никoлић, born 14 December 1993) is a Serbian professional footballer who plays as a midfielder for Vojvodina.

Career
In February 2012, he joined Hungarian club Videoton FC.

In the 2013-14 season he was loaned out to fellow Hungarian first division side Puskás Akadémia.

Club statistics

Honours

Maccabi Tel Aviv
 Israeli Premier League: 2018–19
 Toto Cup: 2018–19

References

External links
at vidi.hu
at hlsz.com

1993 births
Living people
Sportspeople from Niš
Serbian footballers
Association football midfielders
Fehérvár FC players
Puskás Akadémia FC players
FK Jagodina players
FC Dinamo Minsk players
Maccabi Tel Aviv F.C. players
Nemzeti Bajnokság I players
Belarusian Premier League players
Israeli Premier League players
Serbian expatriate footballers
Expatriate footballers in Hungary
Expatriate footballers in Belarus
Expatriate footballers in Israel
Serbian expatriate sportspeople in Hungary
Serbian expatriate sportspeople in Belarus
Serbian expatriate sportspeople in Israel